The Leader of the Conservatives in the European Parliament was the most senior Conservative Member of the European Parliament. The post was last held by Geoffrey Van Orden, who succeeded Ashley Fox in 2019. His term ended after the United Kingdom’s withdrawal from the European Union.

Leaders of Conservative MEPs (1973 to 2020)

References 

Conservative Party (UK)-related lists